is a 1956 black-and-white Japanese film directed by Tomotaka Tasaka.

Cast 
 Yujiro Ishihara as Muneo Aizawa
 Michiyo Aratama: Tomoko Aizawa
 Izumi Ashikawa: Yumiko Kuwahara
 Toyo Fukuda: Katsu Kijima
 Ryoha Hatanaka: Old man
 Hiroshi Hijikata: Policeman
 Ikunosuke Koizumi	
 Eiko Misuz: Natsuko Murakami
 Kyoko Mori: Mariko Aizawa
 Sanae Nakahara: Sachiko Kaneda
 Sonosuke Niki	
 Masao Oda: Doctor
 Akiko Sagawa: Shige, maid
 Ichiro Sakai

References

External links 

Japanese black-and-white films
1956 films
Films directed by Tomotaka Tasaka
Nikkatsu films
1950s Japanese films
Japanese drama films
1956 drama films